Meirav Cohen (born 26 August 1983) is an Israeli politician and activist. She is a member of the Knesset for Yesh Atid, was an MK for the Blue and White alliance from 2019 to 2021 and served as Minister for Social Equality from May 2020 to January 2021. She took up the post again in June 2021.

Biography
Meirav Cohen was born in Jerusalem to Solange Shulamit ( Pouni) and Saadia Cohen, who were Sephardic Jewish immigrants from Morocco. Her father was a bus driver and her mother ran a day care center in their home. The family moved to Mevaseret Zion when she was in fifth grade. She attended Harel High School in Mevaseret.  During her military service in the Israel Defense Forces, she served in the Army Radio as a producer and editor. She graduated from the Hebrew University of Jerusalem with a BA in economics and business administration, and an MA in business administration and urban studies.
Cohen is married to Yuval Admon and has three children. The family resides in the Yefeh Nof neighborhood of Jerusalem.

Civil service career
In 2004 she was appointed socio-economic spokesperson of the Prime Minister's Office under Ariel Sharon.
In 2011 Cohen was elected to Jerusalem City Council as part of the Jerusalem Hitorerut party, becoming the portfolio holder for youth. She became CEO of the NGO Civic Trust, which promotes fair business practices, and founded a nonprofit that fights fraud against the elderly.

Political career
In 2013, she joined Tzipi Livni's Hatnuah party and was placed ninth on the party's list for the 2013 Knesset elections, but the party won only six seats. Prior to the April 2019 elections she joined the Israel Resilience Party. After the party joined the Blue and White alliance, she was given the seventeenth slot on the joint list, and was subsequently elected to the Knesset as the alliance won 35 seats. She was re-elected in September 2019 and March 2020. In May 2020 she was appointed Minister for Social Equality in the new government. In January 2021 she left Blue and White and joined Yesh Atid. In July 2021 she resigned from the Knesset under the Norwegian Law, remaining a government minister.

As Minister for Social Equality, Cohen is in charge of implementing the government's 30-billion shekel five-year plan for the Arab sector.

See also
Women of Israel

References

External links

1983 births
Living people
21st-century Israeli women politicians
Blue and White (political alliance) politicians
Government ministers of Israel
Hebrew University of Jerusalem Faculty of Social Sciences alumni
Israel Resilience Party politicians
Israeli civil servants
Israeli people of Moroccan-Jewish descent
Jewish Israeli politicians
Members of the 21st Knesset (2019)
Members of the 22nd Knesset (2019–2020)
Members of the 23rd Knesset (2020–2021)
Members of the 24th Knesset (2021–2022)
Members of the 25th Knesset (2022–)
Israeli Mizrahi Jews
Politicians from Jerusalem
Israeli Sephardi Jews
Women government ministers of Israel
Women members of the Knesset
Jerusalem School of Business Administration alumni
Jewish women politicians
Jewish women activists